Los Rios (Spanish word meaning The Rivers) may refer to:

Los Ríos, Dominican Republic, a town in the Baoruco province of the Dominican Republic
Los Ríos, Distrito Nacional, Dominican Republic
Los Ríos Region, Chile
Los Ríos Province, Ecuador
Los Rios District, historic district in San Juan Capistrano, California, U.S.
Los Rios Street Historic District
Los Rios, Panama, a township in the Panama Canal Zone

See also
Rios (disambiguation)
 Los Rios Community College District, California, U.S.